Clavulina ingrata is a species of coral fungus in the family Clavulinaceae. Found in Malaysia, it was described by E.J.H. Corner in 1950.

References

External links

Fungi described in 1950
Fungi of Asia
ingrata